The March 1888 Merthyr Tydfil by-election was a parliamentary by-election held for the House of Commons constituency of Merthyr Tydfil in Wales on 14 March 1888.

Vacancy
The by-election was caused by the resignation of the sitting Liberal MP, Charles James who was appointed the Steward of the Manor of Northstead.

Candidates
The only candidate who nominated was industrialist David Alfred Thomas.

Results

References

1888 elections in the United Kingdom
By-elections to the Parliament of the United Kingdom in Welsh constituencies
1888 in Wales
1880s elections in Wales
March 1888 events
Politics of Merthyr Tydfil